Hannele Koskinen, also Antikainen, is a Finnish former competitive figure skater. She is the 1978 Nordic champion and a two-time Finnish national champion (1973, 1978), representing Helsingin taitoluisteluklubi.

Competitive highlights

References 

Finnish female single skaters
Living people
Sportspeople from Helsinki
Year of birth missing (living people)
20th-century Finnish women